The South Florida PGA Championship is a golf tournament that is the championship of the South Florida section of the PGA of America.  The tournament has been played annually since 1979, the year the section was founded.  Alan Morin and Paul Trittler have the most victories with three. PGA Tour winners who have also won the South Florida PGA Championship include Bruce Fleischer (twice), Julius Boros, Bob Murphy, and Tom Shaw.

Winners

References

External links 
PGA of America – South Florida section
South Florida PGA Professional Championship

Golf in Florida
PGA of America sectional tournaments
Recurring sporting events established in 1979